Harald Heide Steen (11 January 1911 – 3 January 1980) was a Norwegian film actor. He appeared in more than 30 films between 1933 and 1977. He was the father of actor Harald Heide-Steen Jr.

Partial filmography

 Vi som går kjøkkenveien (1933) - Jørgen Krogh
 Norge for folket (1936)
 Ungen (1938) - Julius
 Godvakker-Maren (1940) - Even
 Trysil-Knut (1942)
 Vigdis (1943) - Anders Moen, skogsarbeider
 Så møtes vi imorgen (1946) - Jørgen Berg
 Vi vil leve (1946) - Anders Moen
 Om kjærligheten synger de (1946)
 Jørund Smed (1948) - Ola
 Kranes konditori (1951) - Justus Gjør
 Storfolk og småfolk (1951) - Opsal
 Skøytekongen (1953) - Slåttan, skøytetrener
 Portrettet (1954) - Ola
 Det brenner i natt! (1955) - Tims barndomsvenn
 Hjem går vi ikke (1955)
 Toya (1956) - onkel Bjørn
 Salve sauegjeter (1958) - Salve, sauegjeter
 Toya & Heidi (1959) - Onkel Bjørn
 The Master and His Servants (1959) - Forsvareren
 Struggle for Eagle Peak (1960) - Æresrettens formann
 Veien tilbake (1960) - Direktør Stavik
 Petter fra Ruskøy (1960) - Onkel Bjørn
 Et øye på hver finger (1961) - Oberst Allnes
 Hans Nielsen Hauge (1961) - Bjørnstadboenden
 Nå gjør vi så...! (1962)
 Marenco (1964) - Kapteinen
 Ungen (1974) - Forsvareren
 Karjolsteinen (1977) - Didrik

References

External links

1911 births
1980 deaths
Norwegian male film actors
20th-century Norwegian male actors
Male actors from Oslo